Agriphila melike is a moth in the family Crambidae. It was described by Muhabbet Kemal and Ahmet Ömer Koçak in 2004. It is found in Turkey.

References

Crambini
Moths described in 2004
Moths of Asia